"Repeat It" is a song by American rappers Lil Tecca and Gunna, released on August 6, 2021, as the third single from his second mixtape We Love You Tecca 2 (2021). It was produced by Taz Taylor, Census and Nico Baran.

Composition
In the song, Lil Tecca and Gunna sing about the "multiple ways" they "flex their wealth". Tecca also shouts out to his home state of New York: "I'm in New York, where it be cold / Look at my neck, 'cause it's iced out / I'm in the field, we goin' up (Yeah) / Told 'em to cut all the lights out".

Critical reception
In an interview with XXL, Lil Tecca complimented Gunna's guest verse: "this nigga going crazy. It was lit. I ain't even gon' lie." Mackenzie Cummings-Grady of Complex wrote that "Tecca's vibrant flow skates along the track's silky production, while Gunna comes through with his drippy machismo halfway through."

Music video
A music video directed by filmmaking duo Stripmall was released on August 10, 2021. It features "fluorescent colors" and "pink and purple tones". The video shows Lil Tecca in his bedroom with a female friend, and riding in a luxury car in the city streets. Gunna appears within a "psychedelic" forest delivering his verse, before Tecca joins him at a party.

Charts

Certifications

References

2021 singles
2021 songs
Lil Tecca songs
Songs written by Lil Tecca
Gunna (rapper) songs
Songs written by Gunna (rapper)
Songs written by Taz Taylor (record producer)
Song recordings produced by Taz Taylor (record producer)
Republic Records singles